Cedar Township is one of sixteen townships in Calhoun County, Iowa, United States.  As of the 2000 census, its population was 408.

History
Cedar Township was created in 1877. It is named from the Cedar Creek.

Geography
According to the USGS, it contains one cemetery, Cedar.

References

External links
 City-Data.com

Townships in Calhoun County, Iowa
Townships in Iowa